Jean Gaertner (born November 1, 1938) is an American athlete. She competed in the women's high jump at the 1960 Summer Olympics. She also competed in the volleyball tournament at the 1964 Summer Olympics.

References

External links
 

1938 births
Living people
Athletes (track and field) at the 1960 Summer Olympics
Volleyball players at the 1964 Summer Olympics
American female high jumpers
American women's volleyball players
Olympic track and field athletes of the United States
Olympic volleyball players of the United States
Place of birth missing (living people)
21st-century American women